The Wishbone is a 1933 British comedy film directed by Arthur Maude and starring Nellie Wallace, Davy Burnaby and A. Bromley Davenport. It was made at Shepperton Studios as a quota quickie for release by MGM.

Premise
After she inherits fifty pounds, an old lady decides to spend it on a spree.

Cast
 Nellie Wallace as Mrs. Beasley  
 Davy Burnaby as Peters  
 A. Bromley Davenport as Harry Stammer  
 Jane Wood as Mrs. Stammer  
 Renée Macready as Grace Elliott  
 Geoffrey King as Fred Elliott  
 Fred Schwartz  as Jeweler  
 Hugh Lethbridge as Lord Westland

References

Bibliography
 Chibnall, Steve. Quota Quickies: The Birth of the British 'B' Film. British Film Institute, 2007.
 Low, Rachael. Filmmaking in 1930s Britain. George Allen & Unwin, 1985.
 Wood, Linda. British Films, 1927-1939. British Film Institute, 1986.

External links

1933 films
British comedy films
1933 comedy films
Films shot at Shepperton Studios
Films directed by Arthur Maude
Quota quickies
Films set in London
British black-and-white films
1930s English-language films
1930s British films